The Alvis Three Litre series IV, TF21, an updated version of the 1963 TE21, was the last car produced by Alvis Cars, having been announced at the Geneva Motor Show in March 1966 it remained in production until 1967.

Externally, the car was identical to the TE21, but there were some changes to the suspension, and, inside, the instruments were better organised.

A choice of automatic or five-speed gearbox made by ZF was available.

The chassis and suspension continued with front coil springs and leaf springs at the rear. Disc brakes were fitted to all wheels and recirculating ball-type steering gear was used with power assistance optional.

Although this car was an update of the TE21, the TE21 remained available to special order until 1967.  In August 1967, it was announced that production of the Park Ward bodied Alvis 3-litre had ceased.

References

Further reading

 
 

Tf21
Cars introduced in 1966
Rear-wheel-drive vehicles
Coupés
Convertibles